Jürgen Melzer and Philipp Petzschner were the defending champions, but decided not to compete.

Santiago González and Scott Lipsky won the title, defeating John-Patrick Smith and Michael Venus in the final, 4–6, 7–6(9–7), [10–7]

Seeds

Draw

Draw

References 
 Main Draw

Irving Tennis Classic - Doubles
2014 Doubles